Acronychia pauciflora, commonly known as few-flowered acronychia or soft acronychia, is a species of shrub or small tree that is endemic to eastern Australia. It has simple, egg-shaped leaves with the narrower end towards the base, greenish white flowers arranged in small groups, mostly in leaf axils and fleshy, more or less spherical fruit.

Description

Taxonomy
Acronychia pauciflora was first formally described in 1946 by Cyril Tenison White in the Proceedings of the Royal Society of Queensland.

Distribution and habitat
This acronychia grows between Broad Sound in central eastern Queensland, the Richmond River in north-eastern New South Wales and as far inland as the Carnarvon Range.

Conservation status
This species is classified as of "least concern" under the Queensland Government Nature Conservation Act 1992.

References

pauciflora
Flora of Queensland
Flora of New South Wales
Plants described in 1913
Taxa named by Frederick Manson Bailey